Alan Blencowe (born 22 October 1976) is a British Racing driver. He started racing in the 750MC Stock Hatch Series in 1999, winning one race and finishing 4th in the championship driving a Peugeot 205 GTI. In 2000 he raced in the Ford Fiesta Zetec Championship finishing 5th in the championship and also becoming the winter series champion. He stayed in the series for another year, this time finishing 4th in the championship.

For 2002 he made the move up to the BTCC with Gary Ayles Motorsport in the Production class. His debut weekend didn't turn out well when the second driver on the team collided with him in race 1 and was taken out of race two by another competitor while running in 3rd place. Over the course of the season he picked up four Production class podiums, his best result a second place at Thruxton and eventually finishing 7th in the Production class championship. He moved to the Barwell Motorsport team in 2003 and despite only taking one Production class win, his consistency of 18 podiums and only one DNF took him to 2nd in the BTCC Production class championship.

In 2004 he had to make the move over to the Britcar Endurance season as sponsorship was hard to find and again driving for Barwell Motorsport in a Honda Civic Type-R, taking two class wins in the four races he competed in also always being the fastest driver out of the two or sometimes three drivers that competed in the same car.
For 2005 he moved to the SEAT Cupra Championship, finishing 3rd four times and taking 5th in the championship.
In 2006 he finished 2nd in the championship, again his consistency playing part with only one win but 10 podium finishes and one lap record at Knockhill.
At the end of 2006 Blencowe was asked to test for the Seat factory team at Rockingham after his impressive season in the Seat Cupra Cup.
He stayed at Triple R for one more year driving the new SEAT León, winning two races before he left the series after a huge accident at  Snetterton Motor Racing Circuit caused by the pole sitter.

In 2008 Blencowe was asked to drive for Synchro Motorsport ( Honda factory Swindon ) which he did for two races until the car caught fire at Snetterton after an oil leak and burnt the car out.

He now works as a professional driver for Lamborghini when required and he also provides one to one driver coaching all over the UK for personal clients.

Racing record

Complete British Touring Car Championship results
(key) (Races in bold indicate pole position in class - 1 point awarded 2002 all races, 2003 just in first race) (Races in italics indicate fastest lapin class - 1 point awarded all races)

External links
www.AlanBlencowe.racing
Www.carbonneutraldrinks.com
 BTCC Pages Profile.

1976 births
Living people
British Touring Car Championship drivers
English racing drivers
European Touring Car Championship drivers